Francisco Javier Sánchez Silva (born 6 February 1985 in Vina del Mar) is a Chilean former footballer who played as a midfielder, sometimes as a defender.

He is nicknamed Paco, common term of endearment of Francisco in Chile and all countries that speak in Spanish language. Sánchez started his career at Everton in 2004, for one year later, be part of the Chilean U20 team that was part of the 2005 FIFA World Youth Championship.

Club career
Sánchez started his football career in the youth ranks of Everton in 1998, being promoted to the professional adult team in June 2004. Paco became in a key player of Everton during the seasons that faced the club of Viña del Mar. In 2007, he lived his worst season in the team, but in the next season, under the coach Nelson Acosta, the club reached his fourth title in the Chilean Primera División, after 32 years without a league title.

In the second semester of 2008, Sánchez was an undisputed titular, but in the next campaigns, Sánchez was relegated to the bench, and in winter break of 2010, was signed by San Luis Quillota. After of live his first relegation in his career, Paco was released of the club.

In January 2011, Sánchez was signed by Audax Italiano. His first goal for the club came against Universidad Católica, scoring his side's goal in a 3–1 away loss.

Honours

Club
Everton
Primera B (1): 2003
Primera División de Chile (1): 2008 Apertura

Cobresal
Primera División de Chile (1): 2015 Clausura

Unión La Calera
Primera B (1): 2017

References

External links
 BDFA Profile

1985 births
Living people
Sportspeople from Viña del Mar
Chilean footballers
Chile under-20 international footballers
Everton de Viña del Mar footballers
San Luis de Quillota footballers
Audax Italiano footballers
Cobresal footballers
C.D. Antofagasta footballers
Unión La Calera footballers
Chilean Primera División players
Segunda División Profesional de Chile players
Primera B de Chile players
Association football midfielders